Find a Family is a British television programme that aired between 1989 and 1991 across the ITV network.  The programme was an appeal to rehome disadvantaged children  for adoption or long-term fostering.

It usually took the form of a series of short videos shown during advertisement breaks between scheduled program slots.  The  video would appeal for a foster family to a homeless child seeking a family.  During that same week there would be a longer programme which highlighted the results of the phone in campaign for that week.

The theme music for the show was written by Allan Clarke and Gary Benson and performed by The Hollies. The track, "Find Me a Family" (note the slight variation from the programme's title), was released as a single and peaked at No. 79.

The show is not to be confused with the identically titled occasional slot in LWT's The Weekend Live. In 2009, Channel 4 aired a documentary series following a similar theme under the title "Find Me a Family".

References
 Find a Family at BFI

Adoption forms and related practices
1989 British television series debuts
1991 British television series endings
Television series by ITV Studios
Television shows produced by Central Independent Television
English-language television shows